Family Party: 30 Great Games Obstacle Arcade  is a party game released for the Wii U. It was developed by Art Co., Ltd and published by D3 Publisher. The game was released in November 2012 for the PAL region, and in December for North America and Japan. The game was panned by critics.

Gameplay
There are two modes of playing the minigames available: Challenge Mode and Freeplay Mode. Challenge Mode has players compete in five set Wii Remote games based on the world selected at the start, with five randomly chosen Wii U Gamepad games in between. Up to four people (with CPUs to make sure that there are always four players) can play at once to try to beat a set score and unlock more characters and minigames to play in Freeplay Mode. In Freeplay Mode, up to 10 of the minigames can be chosen, regardless of whether they use the Gamepad or the Wii Remotes, to be played in a set order with up to four people (with CPUs to keep the number of players at four, if necessary) with no restrictions or scores to beat.

Despite the title, there are 35 minigames in total. They are spread around five different worlds, with each world having five Wii Remote games and two games that use the Wii U Gamepad.

Reception

Family Party: 30 Great Games Obstacle Arcade was panned by critics, holding a score of 11/100 on Metacritic, making it the second lowest scored game on the website, behind Big Rigs: Over the Road Racing.

Criticism targeted its visuals, design, minigames, controls, and voice acting. Kristoffer Nyrén of Eurogamer said that "the feeling of torture arose" before he played the game, specifically criticizing its graphics for being "extremely outdated" and its controls for frequently malfunctioning. Zack Kaplan of the Nintendo World Report said that "it makes a promise it can't keep, assaults your ears with annoying voice acting, and sucks all the fun out of owning a Wii U", scolding its poor controls, minigames (as "devoid of fun"), and irritating voice acting. Anthony Severino of Game Revolution described it as having "absolutely zero redeeming qualities", chiding its gameplay (as "borderline unplayable"), controls, and voice acting. The Official Nintendo Magazine gave it a score of 11%, jokingly concluding the review (written in the style of a diary) with an "ONM Coroner's Report" that read: "Patient suffered a psychotic breakdown while playing this game. No treatment possible."

Accolades

See also
List of video games notable for negative reception
Game Party Champions
Carnival Games

Notes

 Known in Japan as

References

2012 video games
D3 Publisher games
Party video games
Video games developed in Japan
Simple (video game series)
Wii U eShop games
Wii U games
Wii U-only games